Akira the Don (real name Adam Narkiewicz) is a British musician, DJ, producer, and YouTuber.

His music and production traverses the boundaries between pop, hip-hop, indie, and dance. He lists influences including Ice Cube, Adam Ant, Morrissey, Big Bang, Leonard Cohen, David Bowie and the Wu-Tang Clan. His debut album When We Were Young was produced by Danny Saber. In 2017, Akira the Don released mixtapes in the form of a new genre he created, referred to as "Meaningwave" – a fusion of wave music with meaningful lyrical content and lo-fi hip-hop.

Career

Rapper

Prior to launching a solo career, Akira the Don was a member of hip-hop group Crack Village. In 2006, Akira rapped on Brave Captain's album Distractions. He released his first album When We Were Young the same year.

In May 2011, he released his second LP, The Life Equation. The album is co-produced with Stephen Hague and features collaborations with Gruff Rhys (of Super Furry Animals) and Envy. Akira often produced his own videos. In 2013, Akira performed at Grant Morrison's MorrisonCon.

In March 2014, Akira released A.T.D.R.I.P.. He played his final gig as a traditional rap artist in London on 19 May,.

Producer
Akira has produced songs for a number of artists including two top forty hits for Lethal Bizzle along with songs for Newham Generals' Footsie, Big Narstie, Envy, G-Mane, Littles, Marvin The Martian, Issue, and Time.

In 2011, Akira collaborated with Chilly Gonzales on mixtape.

In 2015, Akira produced a cover of Adamski's "Killer" featuring Grant Morrison.

In 2016, he released a remix of the Stranger Things theme.

Since 2017, Akira the Don has been integrating philosophically inspired lyrical content into his music. He created and developed the Meaningwave Universe which is aimed at inspiring people to find wholesomeness in their lives, and promotes the ideas of peak performance or flow consciousness. He's sampled soundbites from Jordan Peterson, Alan Watts, Joe Rogan, Elon Musk, Fred Rogers, Anthony Bourdain, and others. In 2019, he released dozens of albums during a period of "hyper productivity" 

In September 2021, Meaningwave and Akira the Don were covered on the Fox News Channel talk show Gutfeld!. 

In 2022, Akira was featured on Jordan Peterson's podcast.

DJ
In October 2014 Akira relocated to Los Angeles, where he formed the party rap duo MIDNITEMEN with long time collaborator and nightclub organiser Wade Crescent, and began DJing every week in Hollywood nightspots like The Roosevelt Hotel, Blind Dragon, Hooray Henrys and Bootsy Bellows. The latter is co-owned by David Arquette, for whom Akira provided accent coaching for the actor's role in a stage production of Sherlock Holmes.

As resident DJ at Blind Dragon, he DJed parties for the likes of The Weeknd, Nylon Magazine and Harry Styles. He DJed for Justin Bieber at Hooray Henrys following his VMA's performance.

YouTube
In 2020, Akira started to live-stream daily DJs sets on his YouTube channel, at times doing two sets per day.

Personal life
Born in West Bromwich and raised in North Wales, for most of his career he lived in London. In 2014, he moved to Los Angeles. In 2020, he moved to Texas in order "to secure the future of Meaningwave, his son's childhood, and the very Don Dynasty itself." Since 2021, he has been residing in Mexico.

Discography

Albums

 When We Were Young (Nov 2006)
 The Kidnapping of Akira the Don (Nov 2010) featuring Joey2Tits
 The Life Equation (16 May 2011) co-produced and mixed by Stephen Hague 
 Saturnalia Superman: Akira the Don Salutes the Majesty of Christmas (19 December 2011)
 A.T.D.R.I.P. (11 March 2014)
 12 Rules For Life: The Album (JPWAVE) (5 February 2018) featuring Jordan Peterson
 Goldtron III (9 July 2018)
 JBPWAVE: Genesis (24 August 2018) featuring Jordan Peterson
 MUSKWAVE - A Space Odyssey featuring Elon Musk (21 September 2018)
 Goldtron IV (5 November 2018)
 The Path (25 January 2019) featuring Jocko Willink
 Telling Stories (2021)
 Freedom to Chains (2021)
 The Call to Adventure (2021)
 Truth & Dragons (2022)

EPs
 Akira the Don's First EP (Sep 2004)
 AAA EP (May 2005)
 All I Want for Christmas Is You (and World Peace) EP (Dec 2006)
 Five and a Half Songs About Love (Feb 2006)
 I Am Not Dead (YEAH!) (Oct 2009) featuring Gruff Rhys

References

External links
 Akira The Don's official website
 MusicTowers.com interview Akira the Don
 CMU's Chris Cooke interviews Akira the Don for The Beats Bar – thebeatsbar.co.uk
 Akira the Don's Animated Videos on Newgrounds.com

Living people
Year of birth missing (living people)
British hip hop DJs
British hip hop record producers
British electronic dance music musicians
Lo-fi musicians
People educated at Friars School, Bangor
Trap musicians